(Sunday from Light) is an opera by Karlheinz Stockhausen in five scenes and a farewell, to a libretto written and compiled by the composer. It is the last-composed of seven operas that comprise the cycle Licht (Light). Its stage premiere in 2011 was posthumous, more than three years after the composer's death.

Within the Licht cycle, Sunday is the day of the mystical union of Eve and Michael, from which the new life of Monday proceeds. "In this way there is neither end nor beginning to the week. It is an eternal spiral".

History

The various scenes of the opera were commissioned by different organizations and were premiered separately in concert form. Lichter—Wasser (Lights—Waters) was composed in 1998–99 on commission of the Südwestrundfunk for the Donaueschinger Musiktage, and was premiered on 16 October 1999 in the Baar Gymnasium in Donaueschingen. The second scene, Engel-Prozessionen (Angel Processions), was commissioned by the Groot Omroepkoor (Netherlands Radio Choir) of Hilversum, the Netherlands, and its artistic director Jan Zekveld. It was composed in 2000, and premiered on 9 November 2002 at the Concertgebouw in Amsterdam, with James Wood and David Lawrence conducting and with choreographer Machteld van Bronkhorst.

The music of Licht-Bilder was commissioned by the Centre de Création Musicale Iannis Xenakis (CCMIX), Paris, and a visual realisation was commissioned by the Zentrum für Kunst und Mediatechnologie (ZKM), Karlsruhe, with the support of the Kunststiftung NRW (Art Foundation of North Rhine Westphalia). It was premiered at the Donaueschinger Musiktage, in the Donauhalle B, on 16 October 2004. The performers were Suzanne Stephens (bassett horn), Kathinka Pasveer (flute and alto flute), Hubert Mayer (tenor), Marco Blaauw (trumpet), and Antonio Pérez Abellán (synthesizer), with Karlheinz Stockhausen (sound projection). Image composition, stage design, and costumes were by Johannes Conen, with video collaboration from Yvonne Mohr.

Düfte-Zeichen was commissioned by Peter Ruzicka for the 2003 Salzburg Festival, and was composed between January and March 2002. It received its first performance on 29 August 2003 at the Perner Insel in Hallein (near Salzburg). The performers were Isolde Siebert (high soprano), Ksenja Lukič (soprano), Susanne Otto (alto), Hubert Mayer (tenor), Bernhard Gärtner (tenor), Jonathan de la Paz Zaens (baritone), Nicholas Isherwood (bass), Sebastian Kunz (boy soprano), and Antonio Pérez Abellán (synthesizer), with sound projection by the composer.

The final pair of scenes, Hoch-Zeiten für Chor and Hoch-Zeiten für Orchester (High Times, or Marriages for choir and for orchestra), are performed simultaneously in two different halls. It was commissioned by Rafael Nebot for the Festival de Música de Canarias. It was premiered by the choir and symphony orchestra of the West German Radio Cologne, in the Sala Sinfónica and the Sala de Cámera of the Auditorio Alfredo Kraus in Las Palmas de Gran Canaria on 1 February 2003. Rupert Huber conducted the choir, Zsolt Nagy conducted the orchestra, and the synthesizer players were Antonio Pérez Abellán and Benjamin Kobler. The German premiere with the same forces took place in Cologne on 14 February 2003 at the Philharmonie and the Große Sendesaal of the WDR.

The last element to be completed was the Sonntags-Abschied (Sunday Farewell), which was adapted for five synthesizers in 2003 from Hoch-Zeiten für Chor. It was premiered on 1 August 2004 in the Sülztalhalle in Kürten as the second concert of the 2004 Stockhausen Courses. The performers were Frank Gutschmidt, Benjamin Kobler, Marc Maes, Antonio Pérez Abellán, and Fabrizio Rosso. In concert performances such as the premiere it may be performed live, but in the context of the opera it is intended to be heard in the foyer and/or outside the hall in five-channel playback, possibly with visual projections. There are also two further versions of this Abschied, one for solo percussionist and ten-channel tape titled Strahlen (Rays), the other as Klavierstück XIX, for synthesizer and five-channel tape. Work on the ten-channel electronic music for Strahlen was begun in 2003 by the ZKM, Karlsruhe, but was interrupted in 2004 in favour of producing the visual elements for Licht-Bilder. The tape part was not finished until 2010, though a preliminary version was used for the world premiere on 4 December 2009 in Karlsruhe, with László Hudacsek, vibraphone.

A further component scene, to be performed simultaneously with the rest of the opera but in a separate location, was planned but never composed. This was to have been called Luciferium, in which Lucifer is banished from the opera, and instead "is in the jail (Luciferium). But he listens".

The staged premiere of Sonntag was given by the Cologne Opera in two parts, on Saturday and Sunday, 9 and 10 April 2011, in the Staatenhaus (States' House) of the Kölner Messe. Subsequent performances were given on 20/21, 26/27, and 28/29 April, with the entire opera given in a single day on 24 April and 1 May 2011. The musical direction was by Kathinka Pasveer and Peter Rundel, and the artistic concept by Franc Aleu (from Urano), and by Roland Olbeter and Carlus Padrissa (from La Fura dels Baus). The staging was by Carlus Padrissa, with dramaturgy by Thomas Ulrich. Stage design was by Roland Olbeter, costumes by Chu Uroz, and lighting by Andreas Grüter. Video production was by Franc Aleu and choreography by Athol Farmer and Carlos Paz.

The production left a budget deficit for the Cologne Opera that, when combined with a decrease in municipal funding, led to director Uwe Erik Laufenberg's resignation.

Roles

Synopsis

Sonntag takes as its subject the Solar System and the relationships of all the planets that orbit the Sun. In this opera, the Earth and life on it is represented as the result of the union of light and water. These two elements are presented in the first scene, and the rest of the opera celebrates the evolution of life, of plants, animals, humans, and above all this the planets, moons, and heavenly constellations. The opera has a pronounced ritualistic and meditative character, with very little that can be described as dramatic action. There are five scenes (or six, counting the two versions of Hoch-Zeiten separately), and a concluding "farewell". Most of the scenes include elaborate spatial movement, each with "a distinctive spatial imprint".

Scene 1: Lichter—Wasser (Sunday Greeting)
Lichter—Wasser (Lights—Waters) is both the first scene and the "Gruss" (greeting) of the opera. An initial duet by the soprano (Eve) and tenor (Michael) is followed by the entrance of the orchestra, who take their places throughout the audience, which is arranged in triangular segments facing the centre. Each musician is provided with a rack with a lamp and a glass of water. Seventeen high-register instruments are identified by seventeen blue lamps, corresponding to the Michael formula, and twelve lower-register instruments are lit by green lamps, corresponding to the Eve formula. The music rotates through the space in two simultaneous layers and in 12 successive waves. These rotations are related to the planets and moons of the Solar System, whose names, astronomical characteristics, and symbolisms form a part of the sung texts, which were written by the composer. At the end, the musicians make their exit and the soprano and tenor sing a closing duet.

Scene 2: Engel-Prozessionen
In the second scene, Engel-Prozessionen (Angel Processions), seven groups of angels move through the space singing God's praises in seven languages (Ulrich 2011, 3). The seventh group consists of four soloists, and are the Angels of Joy (Sunday Angels). They sing in German. The soprano and tenor soloists should either be the same as in scene 1, or strongly resemble them. The other six choirs are Angels of Water (Monday Angels), Angels of Earth (Tuesday Angels), Angels of Life (Wednesday Angels), Angels of Music (Thursday Angels), Angels of Light (Friday Angels), and Angels of Heaven (Saturday Angels), and sing in Hindi, Chinese, Spanish, English, Arabic, and Swahili, respectively. The texts were all written by the composer in German, and translated into the respective languages. In Lichter—Wasser the composed movement of sounds in the hall is only apparent, with musicians remaining at stationary positions, but in Engel-Prozessionen spatial movement is real, with the singers physically moving through the performance area.

Scene 3: Licht-Bilder
The scene Licht-Bilder is performed by two pairs of musicians, a flute and basset horn on the one hand, and a tenor and trumpet on the other. The tenor (Michael) sings the praises of God in the form of His creations, manifested from stones to spirits. The music is accompanied by corresponding light images, hence the title of the scene. The flute and basset horn represent Eve, while the tenor and trumpet represent Michael, and each pair always sound together. Although the musical material is all drawn from the Michael and Eve layers of the Licht superformula, the assignment of these melodies to the pairs changes from section to section. The musical figures given to the basset horn and flute on the one hand, and to the tenor and trumpet on the other, are gradually displaced and then brought together again seven times, forming large phases corresponding to the days of the week. At the same time, movements of the performers on the stage corresponding to the musical figures are composed, and the waves are mirrored by a double ring modulation, creating new harmonies and timbres.

Scene 4: Düfte-Zeichen

The fourth scene recapitulates the seven days of the entire Licht cycle. The protagonists explain each day in terms of their characteristic signs and scents. Afterward, Eve appears as Earth Mother (sung by an alto), and Michael appears in the form of a boy soprano. The seven fragrances chosen for the days of the week, their associated geographical areas, and the seven voices and voice combinations are:
 Monday: Cúchulainn (Ireland), solo for high soprano
 Tuesday: Kyphi (Egypt), duet for tenor and bass
 Wednesday: Mastic (Greece), trio for soprano, tenor, and baritone
 Thursday: Rosa Mystica (Italy/Germany), solo for high tenor
 Friday: Tate Yunanaka (Mexico), duet for soprano and baritone
 Saturday: Ud (India), solo for bass
 Sunday: Frankincense (Africa), duet for high soprano and high tenor
An alto voice from outside the hall, identifying herself as Eve, causes the soloists to run out, in turbulence. They return in procession, escorting the alto to the front while singing an "overtone chant." The alto Eve calls the boy Michael to her out of the audience, they sing a mystical duet, and she takes him with her into another world.

Scene 5: Hoch-Zeiten for Choir and for Orchestra 

Hoch-Zeiten (High Times, or Marriages) is performed simultaneously in two different halls by five choral groups and five orchestral sections, respectively. The five divisions in each hall perform at independent speeds, producing "a tour de force of multiple superimposed tempi". The performance is then repeated, with the audiences changing halls. As such, these two versions are sometimes regarded as both the fifth and sixth scenes of Sonntag. The basic structure of the orchestral version is identical to that of Hoch-Zeiten for Choir, but has added to it five duos and two trios performed by the first-desk players of the orchestra. These ensembles are recollections of characteristic moments from each of the seven operas in the Licht cycle, presented not in weekday order but in the order they were composed:
 Thursday duo, for trumpet and clarinet, quoting from Mondeva, act 1, scene 2 of Donnerstag
 Saturday duo, for flute and trombone, quoting from Kathinkas Gesang, scene 2 of Samstag
 Monday duo, for viola and cello, quoting from Wochenkreis, the second "situation" of act 2, scene 3 (Evas Lied) of Montag
 Tuesday duo, for flugelhorn and trombone, quoting from Pietà, in act 2 of Dienstag
 Friday duo, for oboe and bassoon, quoting from Elufa, the ninth "real scene" of Freitag
 Wednesday trio, for clarinet, violin, and cello, quoting from the "Carousel" section of Michaelion, scene 4 of Mittwoch
 Finally, a Sunday trio for flute, viola, and synthesizer, quoting the opening of Lichter—Wasser, the first scene of Sonntag.

Sonntags-Abschied

The Sunday Farewell is essentially Hoch-Zeiten for choir played by five synthesizers, including the phonetic notation of the original vocal texts. It is not so much an arrangement as an adaptation, and is intended for five-channel playback in recorded form in the foyer and outdoors as the audience exits the theatre.

Discography
Like all of the other complete recordings of the Licht operas in the Stockhausen Complete Edition, the one of Sonntag aus Licht is a composite one, though (unlike five others) it has not been released as a boxed set, but rather on six separate CDs. This was broadcast by SWR in September 2007. The recordings actually date from 1999, 2002, 2003, and 2004, and were made in various venues, as detailed below.
Scene 1: Lichter—Wasser (Sonntags-Gruss). Barbara van den Boom (soprano), Hubert Mayer (tenor), Antonio Pérez Abellán (synthesizer), SWR-Sinfonieorchester Baden-Baden/Freiburg, Karlheinz Stockhausen (cond.). CD 58 (single CD), recorded in Donaueschingen in 1999 [52 mins. 07 secs.]. Kürten: Stockhausen-Verlag, 2000.
Scene 2: Engel-Prozessionen and Pianissimo Choir Tutti of Engel-Prozessionen. Isolde Siebert (soprano), Janet Collins (alto), Hubert Mayer (tenor), Andreas Fischer (bass), Groot Omroepkoor (Netherlands Radio Choir), James Wood and David Lawrence (cond.), Karlheinz Stockhausen (musical supervision and sound projection). CD 67 A-B (2CDs), recorded in Amsterdam in 2002 [41 mins. + 41 mins.]. Kürten: Stockhausen-Verlag, 2004.
Scene 3: Licht-Bilder. Hubert Mayer (tenor), Kathinka Pasveer (flute with ring modulation), Suzanne Stephens (basset horn), Marco Blaauw (trumpet with ring modulation), Antonio Pérez Abellán (synthesizer), Karlheinz Stockhausen (sound Projection). Two versions, one without ring-modulation for study purposes. CD 68 A-B (2CDs), recorded in Donaueschingen in 2004 [43 mins. + 43 mins.]. Kürten: Stockhausen-Verlag, 2005.
Scene 4: Düfte-Zeichen. Isolde Siebert (high soprano), Ksenija Lukic (soprano), Susanne Otto (alto), Hubert Mayer (high tenor), Bernhard Gärtner (tenor), Jonathan de la Paz Zaens (baritone), Nicholas Isherwood (bass), Sebastian Kunz (boy's voice), Antonio Pérez Abellán (synthesizer), Karlheinz Stockhausen (musical direction and sound projection) CD 69 (single CD), recorded in Salzburg in 2003. Kürten: Stockhausen-Verlag, 2004.
9 Düfte Der Woche aus Düfte Zeichen vom Sonntag aus LICHT (separate versions of the sub-scenes). Isolde Siebert (high soprano), Ksenija Lukic (soprano), Susanne Otto (alto), Hubert Mayer (high tenor), Bernhard Gärtner (tenor), Jonathan de la Paz Zaens (baritone), Nicholas Isherwood (bass), Sebastian Kunz (boy's voice), Antonio Pérez Abellán (synthesizer), Karlheinz Stockhausen (musical direction and sound projection) CD 70 (single CD)
Scene 5: Hoch-Zeiten für Orchester, Hoch-Zeiten für Chor. WDR Sinfonieorchester, Zsolt Nagy and five assistant conductors (conds.); WDR Rundfunkchor, Rupert Huber and five conducting choir members (cond..); Antonio Pérez Abellán (synthesizer), Karlheinz Stockhausen (sound projection and musical direction). CD 73 (single CD). [74 mins.]. Kürten: Stockhausen-Verlag, 2004.
Hoch-Zeiten für Chor vom Sonntag aus Licht: 5 einzelne Gruppen und Tutti zum Studium. WDR Rundfunkchor, Rupert Huber and five conducting choir members (conds.). CD 71 A–C (3CDs), recorded in Cologne in 2003. Kürten: Stockhausen-Verlag, 2004.
Hoch-Zeiten für Orchester vom Sonntag aus Licht: 5 einzelne Gruppen und Tutti zum Studium (study material). WDR Sinfonieorchester, Zsolt Nagy, and Wolfgang Lischke (conductors) CD 72 A–C (3CDs), recorded in Cologne in 2003. Kürten: Stockhausen-Verlag, 2004.
Farewell: Sonntags-Abschied and click tracks from Sonntags Abschied. Marc Maes, Frank Gutschmidt, Fabrizio Rosso, Benjamin Kobler, and Antonio Pérez Abellán (synthesizers), Karlheinz Stockhausen (sound projection). CD 74 (single CD), recorded in Kürten in 2004 [35 mins. + 34 mins. 30 secs.]. Kürten: Stockhausen-Verlag, 2005.

References

Cited sources

Further reading

 Anker, Francois van den. 26 April 2011. "Negen uur Stockhausen in Keulen". Opera Magazine [Netherlands]. (Accessed 29 April 2011)
 Anon. 10 April 2011. "Kölner Publikum begeistert". Kölner Stadt-Anzeiger.
 Anon. 12 April 2011. "Die Heilsgeschichte ist bereinigt". Frankfurter Allgemeine Zeitung, no. 86: 32.
 Apthorp, Shirley. 13 April 2011. "Sonntag aus Licht, Staatenhaus, Cologne". Financial Times.
 Baumanns, Robert. 12 April 2011. "Stockhausen-Wahnsinn Sonntag aus Licht". Express.
 Baumanns, Robert. 12 April 2011. "'Sensationell': Die Welt feiert Kölns Stockhausen-Spektakel". Express
 Bendig, Karoline. 25 April 2011. "Mutig voran: Karlheinz Stockhausens Sonntag aus Licht in Köln (Teil I)". Kultura-Extra. (Accessed 29 April 2011)
 Bendig, Karoline. 25 April 2011. "[http://www.kultura-extra.de/theater/feull/rezension_sonntag_aus_licht_teil2_operkoeln.php Erhaben zurück in den Alltag: Karlheinz Stockhausens Sonntag aus Licht] (Teil II)". Kultura-Extra. (Accessed 29 April 2011)
 Bianchi, Oscar. 2013. "Generative Processes in Stockhausen's Lichter—Wasser". DMA diss. New York: Columbia University. .
 Boutsko, Anastassia. 11 April 2011. "Stockhausen's Sonntag Premieres as a Sensual Hymn of Praise". Deutsche Welle (Accessed 16 July 2011).
 Boutsko, Anastassia. 14 April 2011. "Гений, безумец, шарлатан: опера Штокхаузена сбила зрителей с ног" [Genius, Charlatan, Madman: Stockhausen Opera Ran the Audience Off Their Legs], edited by Daria Bryantseva. Deutsche Welle (Accessed 16 July 2011).
 Boutsko, Anastassia, and Augusto Valente. 11 April 2011. "Estreia mundial de Sonntag de Stockhausen combina megalomania e beleza intimista", edited by Bettina Riffel. Deutsche Welle (Accessed 16 July 2011).
 Braun, Thomas Manfred. 2008. "Das magische Quadrat in Karlheinz Stockhausens LICHT-BILDER". In Gedenkschrift für Stockhausen, edited by Suzanne Stephens and Kathinka Pasveer, 19–30. Kürten: Stockhausen-Stiftung für Musik. .
 Brembeck, Reinhard. 12 April 2011. "Kosmische Freudenbotschaft". Süddeutsche Zeitung.
 Brümmer, Ludger. Winter 2008. "Stockhausen on Electronics, 2004". Computer Music Journal 32, no. 4: 10–16.
 Cabral, Ismael G. 16 April 2011. "Karlheinz Stockhausen, SONNTAG aus LICHT. Estreno: Oper Köln (9/10-04-2011)". Chorro de Luz (accessed 29 April 2011).
 Canning, Hugh. September 2011. "Cologne". Opera: 1070, 1072–1073.
 Doppler, Bernhard. 10 April 2011. "Ein Sonntag in Weiß und Gold Stockhausens großes Licht-Zyklus-Finale in Köln." Deutschlandfunk Kultur (Accessed 16 July 2011).
 Drew, Joseph. 2014. "Michael from Light: A Character Study of Karlheinz Stockhausen's Hero". Ph.D. diss. New York: New York University.
 Frei, Marco. 13 April 2011. "Rituale der Entfremdung: Sonntag aus Karlheinz Stockhausens siebenteiligem Opernzyklus Licht in Köln uraufgeführt", Neue Zürcher Zeitung.
 Frisius, Rudolf. 2013. Karlheinz Stockhausen III: Die Werkzyklen 1977–2007. Mainz, London, Berlin, Madrid, New York, Paris, Prague, Tokyo, Toronto: Schott Music. .
 Fuchs, Jörn Florian. 13 April 2011. "Mit den Ohren ins Weltall; Karlheinz Stockhausens Sonntag aus Licht wurde in Köln erstmals komplett szenisch aufgeführt". Schwäbisches Tagblatt, Tübinger Chronik, Rottenburger Post, Reutlinger Blatt. (Accessed 29 August 2011).
 Hahn, Patrick. 11 April 2011. "Musikus und Himmelsmama: Stockhausens SONNTAG aus LICHT als szenische Uraufführung in Köln". Neue Musikzeitung Online (accessed 29 April 2011).
 Hartwell, Robin. Winter–Summer 2012. "Threats and Promises: Lucifer, Hell, and Stockhausen's Sunday from Light". Perspectives of New Music 50, nos. 1 & 2: 393–424.
 Henkel, Georg. 2016. "Angel of Joy: Stockhausen's 'Mirrors in Sound' [Klangspiegel] and the Audibility of the Inaudible". In The Musical Legacy of Karlheinz Stockhausen: Looking Back and Forward, edited by M. J. Grant and Imke Misch, 138–147. Hofheim: Wolke Verlag. .
 Hoffmann, Stephan. 12 April 2011. "Farben, Düfte, Engelschöre". Stuttgarter Nachrichten.
 Hoffmann, Stephan. 13 April 2011. "Stockhausen-Oper: Für jeden Tag ein anderer Duft: Die postume Uraufführung von Karlheinz Stockhausens Oper Sonntag aus Licht in Köln". Badische Zeitung.
 Hollings, Ken. May 1999. " Lost in the Stars: Karlheinz Stockhausen in Conversation with Ken Hollings, Kurten, Germany, 12 March 1999". The Wire, no. 184.
 Kohl, Jerome. 2004. "Der Aspekt der Harmonik in Licht." In Internationales Stockhausen-Symposion 2000: LICHT. Musikwissenschaftliches Institut der Universität zu Köln, 19. bis 22. Oktober 2000. Tagungsbericht, edited by Imke Misch and Christoph von Blumröder, 116–132. Münster, Berlin, London: LIT-Verlag. .
 Kovács, Adorján F. 2011. "Grandioses Spektakel: Lichter und Wasser: Eloge auf die szenische Uraufführung von Stockhausens Oper Sonntag aus Licht". MusikTexte, no. 129:76–78.
 Kübler, Susanne. 12 April 2011. "Ist das Grösse oder Grössenwahn?" Der Bund.
 Lange, Joachim. 12 April 2011. "Vorn ist das Licht". Frankfurter Rundschau.
 López Rosellcolònia, César. 12 April 2011. "La Fura es posa còsmica i mística". El Periódico de Catalunya.
 Maconie, Robin. October 2004. "Message of 'Light': Goethe, Stockhausen, and the New Enlightenment". Tempo new series 58, no. 230: 2–8.
 Maconie, Robin. 2016. Other Planets: The Complete Works of Karlheinz Stockhausen 1950–2007, updated edition. Lanham, Maryland, and London: Rowman & Littlefield. .
 Maconie, Robin. 2005. Other Planets: The Music of Karlheinz Stockhausen. Lanham, Maryland, Toronto, Oxford: The Scarecrow Press. .
 Merlin, Christian. 26 September 2003. "Stockhausen—'Le souffle de Dieu est le son fondamental de l'univers'". Le Figaro.
 Miller, Paul. 2009. "Stockhausen and the Serial Shaping of Space". Ph.D. diss. Rochester: Eastman School of Music.
 Minguet, Vicent. 2011. "Cròniques de concerts: Sonntag aus Licht, Karlheinz Stockhausen". Sonograma (24 April).
 Mörchen, Raoul. 11 April 2011. "Der Tag der Anbetung Spektakuläre Uraufführung". General-Anzeiger (Bonn).
 Müller, Regine. 12 April 2011. "Turbotheater für Stockhausen". Rheinische Post.
 Nardelli, Stefano. 2011. "Domenica di Fura: Sonntag aus Licht, di Karlheinz Stockhausen".  (accessed 16 April 2011).
 Nonnenmann, Rainer. 11 April 2011. "Geschichte wird geschrieben". Kölner Stadt-Anzeiger (accessed 29 August 2011).
 Nonnenmann, Rainer. 2011. "Mysterienspiel im Hightech-Gewand. Karlheinz Stockhausens Sonntag aus Licht in Köln". MusikTexte, no. 129:75–76.
 Obiera, Pedro. 13 April 2011. "Im Liegestuhl zu Eva und neuen Planeten". Aachener Nachrichten.
 Parsons, Ian Lawrence. 2019. "The Phenomenology of Light: an Interpretation of Stockhausen's Opera Cycle Drawing on Heidegger's Fourfold and Lacanian Psychoanalysis". Ph.D. diss. Melbourne: Monash University.
 Peters, Günter. October 2004. "Grenzgänge in den Mittelpunkt der Musik. Karlheinz Stockhausen auf dem Weg zu Düfte-Zeichen vom Sonntag aus Licht."  8, no. 32: 61–81.
 Robin, William. 8 May 2011. "An Operatic Conundrum Untangled". The New York Times: AR19 (New York edition) (accessed 8 May 2011).
 Schmidt, Constanze. 11 April 2011. "Jubel über Stockhausen in Köln". Kölnische Rundschau.
 Spahn, Claus. 21 October 2004. "Am Ende des Lichts". Die Zeit.
 Spahn, Claus. 14 April 2011. "Stockhausen-Uraufführung: Hängematte im Himmel". Die Zeit.
 Stockhausen, Karlheinz. 2001a. Lichter—Wasser (Sonntags-Gruss) für Sopran, Tenor uns Orchester mit Synthesizer (1999), Werk Nr. 75. Kürten: Stockhausen-Verlag.
 Stockhausen, Karlheinz. 2001b. Stockhausen Courses Kürten 2001: Composition Course on Lights-Waters (Sunday Greeting) for Soprano, Tenor, and orchestra with synthesizer (1999). Kürten: Stockhausen-Verlag.
 Stockhausen, Karlheinz. 2003b. Composition Course on Light Pictures (3rd Scene of Sunday from Light) for Basset Horn, Flute with Ring Modulations, Tenor, Trumpet with Ring Modulation, Synthesizer (2002/03). Kürten: Stockhausen-Verlag.
 Stockhausen, Karlheinz 2004a. Composition Course on Scents-Signs (of Sunday from Light) for 7 Vocalists, Boy's Voice, Sythesizer (2002). Kürten: Stockhausen-Verlag.
 Stockhausen, Karlheinz. 2005. Engel-Prozessionen für Chor a capella: 2. Szene vom Sonntag aus Licht (2000—Werk Nr. 76). Partitur für szenische oder quasi konzertante Aufführungen. Kürten: Stockhausen-Verlag.
 Tariman, Pablo A. 2 May 2011. "Filipino Baritone Gets Crucial Role in a Stockhausen Opera in Cologne". Philippine Daily Inquirer (accessed 8 May 2011).
 Ulrich, Thomas. Winter–Summer 2012. "Lucifer and Morality in Stockhausen's Opera Cycle Licht". Perspectives of New Music 50, nos. 1 & 2: 313–341.
 Ulrich, Thomas. 2017. Stockhausens Zyklus LICHT: Ein Opernführer. Cologne, Weimar, and Vienna: Böhlau Verlag. .
 Vela del Campo, Juan Ángel. 27 April 2011. "La Fura dels Baus, una ópera europea: Carlus Padrissa ofrece en Colonia un colosal montaje de nueve horas de Sonntag, de Stockhausen—Àlex Ollé estrena Quartett, de Francesconi, en la Scala de Milán". El País.
 Walls, Seth Colter. 15 April 2011. "Karlheinz Stockhausen's Opera Sonntag aus Licht Performed in Cologne". The Washington Post.

External links
Rehearsal videos, Ensemble Musikfabrik
, and Christine Chapman (horn player from Ensemble Musikfabrik) interviewing Kathinka Pasveer

Operas by Karlheinz Stockhausen
20th-century classical music
21st-century classical music
Operas
2003 operas
2011 operas
Multiple-language operas
Serial compositions
Spatial music
Operas set in fictional, mythological and folkloric settings